Thallarcha chrysochares is a species of moth of the subfamily Arctiinae first described by Edward Meyrick in 1886. It is found in Australia.

References

Lithosiini
Moths described in 1886